The School District of La Crosse is a school district in La Crosse County, Wisconsin, United States. The district serves the city of La Crosse, Wisconsin as well as several surrounding suburbs. As of 2021, the district has 16 separate facilities, providing a total of 20 elementary, middle, high, and charter school programs. 

As of the 2021–2022 school year, the district has a total enrollment of 6,139 and a student/teacher ratio of 11.13. In total, the district has an average attendance rate of 95.1% and an annual dropout rate of 0.3%.

Schools

High schools
La Crosse Central High School, established in 1907. Built in 1967. Athletic teams are known as the Riverhawks.
Logan High School, established in 1929. Built in 1979. Athletic teams are known as the Rangers.

Middle schools
Logan Middle School
Longfellow Middle School

Elementary schools
Emerson Elementary School
Hamilton Elementary School
Hintgen Elementary School
North Woods International Elementary School
Northside Elementary School
Southern Bluffs Elementary School
Spence Elementary School
State Road Elementary School
Summit Environmental School

Charter schools
Coulee Montessori School
LaCrossroads Charter School
School of Technology and Arts I
School of Technology and Arts II
La Crosse Polytechnic School
Seven Rivers Community High School

Proposal for new high school

In 2022, the school board put in a proposal to have a referendum on building a new high school at the former Trane Company headquarters site at 3600 Pammel Creek Road. The total cost for the new school facilities and renovation of other schools in the school district were estimated at $194.7 million. The proposal would have combined the two current high schools Central High School and Logan high school at the new site. The referendum appeared on the 2022 midterms ballot on November 8th and was not approved.

References

External links
School District of La Crosse

School District
School districts in Wisconsin
Education in La Crosse County, Wisconsin